The Chicago Pirates were a professional baseball team based in Chicago, Illinois, that played in the Players' League for one season in 1890. The franchise used South Side Park as their home field. During their only season in existence, the team finished fourth in the PL with a record of 75-62.

Players

References

External links
Franchise index at Baseball-Reference and Retrosheet

Major League Baseball all-time rosters
Chicago Pirates